Cyril John Mitchley (born 4 July 1938) is a South African former cricket player, umpire and match referee. As an umpire he officiated in first-class and Test cricket matches.

Playing career
During the late 1960s he played for Transvaal as a wicket-keeper in South African domestic cricket.

Umpiring and refereeing career 
He later became an umpire, culminating with him becoming a Test cricket umpire. Between 1992 and 2000, he stood in 26 Test matches and 61 One Day Internationals (ODIs).

In a match between South Africa and India in 1992, Mitchley made history by making the first referral to a third umpire in Test cricket history. Sachin Tendulkar was out after Mitchley referred a run out decision.

He famously gave two LBWs when English bowler Dominic Cork took a hat-trick against the West Indies at Old Trafford in 1995.

He later became an ICC match referee, officiating on four ODIs, all in 2007.

See also
 List of Test cricket umpires
 List of One Day International cricket umpires

References

1938 births
Living people
South African cricketers
South African Test cricket umpires
South African One Day International cricket umpires